Crawford Farms is a neighborhood that is located in north Fort Worth, Texas and is generally bound by Golden Triangle on the north and Old Denton Road on the west.  It is adjacent to the Sunset Hills, Heritage, and Vista Meadows neighborhoods.  Timberview Middle School is physically located adjacent to the Crawford Farms neighborhood.

It is a 1,072 home residential community which an abundance of amenities.  Homeowner Association membership is automatic when purchasing a home within Crawford Farms.

Awards
2016 Mayor's Health and Wellness Award, Fort Worth Neighborhood Award
2016 Neighborhood Newsletter Award, Fort Fort Worth Neighborhood Award

Education
The neighborhood is zoned to schools in the Keller ISD and is served by:
Eagle Ridge Elementary School, Fort Worth
Timberview Middle School, Fort Worth
Timber Creek High School, Fort Worth

Neighborhood Gallery

Recreation
The community provides several amenities, including swimming pools, a covered playground, walking trails, an outdoor basketball court, an outdoor tennis court, a fishing pond, and an outdoor gym.

See also
 List of Neighborhoods in Fort Worth, Texas

References

External links
 Crawford Farms HOA

Neighborhoods in Fort Worth, Texas